Staphylus oeta, commonly known as Plötz's sootywing, is a species of butterfly in the family Hesperiidae. It is found in Brazil, Panama, Peru and Argentina.

References

Staphylus (butterfly)
Butterflies described in 1884
Hesperiidae of South America